Amer Delic was the defending champion, but he chose not to compete this year.
Wayne Odesnik won in the final 6–4, 6–4, against Scoville Jenkins.

Seeds

Draw

Final four

Top half

Bottom half

Sources
 Main Draw

External links
 Qualifying Draw

Home Depot Center USTA Challenger - Singles
USTA LA Tennis Open